Daviesia triflora is a species of flowering plant in the family Fabaceae and is endemic to South West Australia. It is a rush-like, leafless shrub with many stems, and orange-yellow and dark flowers.

Description

Taxonomy
Daviesia triflora was first formally described in 1984 by Michael Crisp from specimens collected by Charles Chapman near the junction of the Green Head road and the Brand Highway in 1976. The specific epithet (triflora) means "three-flowered".

Distribution and habitat
This daviesia usually grows on sandy soil in heath or open forest and occurs from near Mullewa to Perth in the Avon Wheatbelt, Geraldton Sandplains, Jarrah Forest and Swan Coastal Plain bioregions of south-western Western Australia.

Conservation status
Daviesia triflora is classified as "not threatened" by the Government of Western Australia Department of Biodiversity, Conservation and Attractions.

References

External links
Daviesia triflora occurrence data from the Australasian Virtual Herbarium

triflora
Rosids of Western Australia
Plants described in 1984
Taxa named by Michael Crisp